Victoria Reifler Bricker (born 1940) is an American anthropologist, ethnographer and linguist, widely known for her ground-breaking studies of contemporary and historical Maya culture.

Early life and education 
Born in Hong Kong, Bricker studied at Stanford University for her undergraduate education, and graduated in 1962 with a bachelor's degree in philosophy and humanities. She attended Harvard University for her graduate education, earning a master's degree in anthropology in 1963 and a Ph.D. in 1968.

Career and research 
Bricker has spent her career at Tulane University; she was a visiting lecturer from 1969 to 1970, an assistant professor from 1970 to 1973, an associate professor from 1973 to 1978, and was appointed a full professor in 1978. She is now a professor emerita there. Bricker's research has focused on various aspects of Maya culture in Guatemala, Chiapas, and Yucatán. In Chiapas, she studied Maya ritual humor, oral history, and revitalization, the latter being a subject of her research in Guatemala and Yucatán. In Yucatán, she has also worked on a Maya-English dictionary, the Maya language, and ethnobotany.  Bricker has also studied Precolumbian Maya astronomy, calendars, astrology, divination, and script. Her work included studies of the Dresden Codex and Madrid Codex. Her collection of recordings and transcriptions of the Chol, Tzotzil, and Yucatec Maya languages are available at the Archive of the Indigenous Languages of Latin America, and audio recordings and manuscripts are available at the American Philosophical Society archives.

She speaks Spanish, and two Mayan languages: Yucatec and Tzotzil.

Honors and awards 
A member of several scientific societies, Bricker has also served in leadership roles with academic publications and societies. She was elected to the National Academy of Science in 1991 and maintains membership in the American Philosophical Society.
 Editor, American Ethnologist (1973–1976)
 Associate editor, Journal of Mayan Linguistics (1978 – )
 Executive board, American Anthropological Association (1980 – )
 Editorial board, Middle American Research Institute (1981 – )
 Chair, Dept. of Anthropology at Tulane University (1988–1991)
 Member, National Academy of Sciences (1991)
 Member, American Philosophical Society (2002)
 Member, American Society for Ethnohistory
 Member, Linguistic Society of America
 Member, Société des Americanistes

Bibliography 
 Ritual Humor among the Highland Maya
 The Indian Christ, the Indian King
 Astronomy in the Maya Codices (with Harvey M. Bricker)
 An Encounter of Two Worlds: The Book of Chilam Balam of Kaua (with Helga-Maria Miram)
 A Historical Grammar of the Maya Language of Yucatán, 1577-2000

References 

1940 births
Living people
American women anthropologists
American women scientists
American ethnologists
Women ethnologists
Harvard Graduate School of Arts and Sciences alumni
American Mesoamericanists
Women Mesoamericanists
Members of the American Philosophical Society
Members of the United States National Academy of Sciences
Emigrants from British Hong Kong to the United States
Stanford University alumni
Tulane University faculty
American women academics
21st-century American women